Roberta Morgan Wohlstetter (August 22, 1912 – January 6, 2007) was an American historian of U.S. military intelligence. She authored Pearl Harbor: Warning and Decision, which former Secretary of Defense Donald Rumsfeld is said to have required his aides read. Indeed, it was brought up during discussions of intelligence failures leading to the successful Al-Qaeda attack on the World Trade Center and Pentagon.

Early life and education
Wohlstetter was born Roberta Mary Morgan, the daughter of Edmund M. Morgan, Jr., a Harvard Law School professor who helped to simplify the federal rules of civil procedure and to modernize the U.S. code of military justice. Her husband was the late nuclear strategist Albert Wohlstetter.

Wohlstetter received her bachelor's degree from Vassar College and master's degrees from Columbia University and Radcliffe College.

Career

Pearl Harbor: Warning and Decision

Her book Pearl Harbor: Warning and Decision attempts to explain the causes of the U.S. intelligence failures that led to Imperial Japan's 1941 surprise attack. In the years preceding the attack, U.S. code breakers were routinely reading much of the Japanese military and diplomatic traffic. However, a Japanese attack came as both a strategic and a tactical surprise. On the strategic level, U.S. intelligence analysts viewed the attack as unlikely because Japan could not expect to win the subsequent war (as it happens, Japanese planners had never completed a thorough strategic assessment. They were unwilling to abandon their expansion in east Asia and viewed the attack as the best way to start the inevitable confrontation). Furthermore, on several occasions during 1940-41 U.S. forces were put on high alert but no attack came, leading to fatigue. Finally, it was believed that the logical place for a Japanese attack would be in the Philippines. The book argues, in part, that intelligence failures are to be expected because of the difficulty identifying "signals" from the background "noise" of raw facts, regardless of the quantity of the latter.

On a tactical level, the attack came as a surprise because warning mechanisms - radar stations and patrol planes - were not deployed, although senior officers came to believe they were.

The book has been praised for its high degree of scholarship. Military history writer Eugene Rasor wrote in 1998 that the book is "the best and most comprehensive study of the intelligence failure that led to the surprise attack". The book's findings and implications for modern intelligence analysts were updated in 2013 in another volume published by Stanford University Press, Constructing Cassandra, Reframing Intelligence Failure at the CIA, 1947-2001. That volume outlines how the hypotheses that Wohlstetter identifies as the mechanism by which intelligence "signals" are sorted from background "noise" are neither uniform, entirely rational or random, but are instead functions of the culture and identity of the analytic unit.

Presidential Medal of Freedom
She and her husband were jointly awarded the Presidential Medal of Freedom by President Ronald Reagan in 1985. Reagan said:

Roberta Wohlstetter, a generation ahead of her time, asserted her influence in areas dominated by and, in some cases, reserved for men. She rose above all obstacles and has had a profound influence. Her inquiries went to the heart of the system of our society, focusing on essential questions. Her analysis of the problems of terrorism, intelligence, and warning and, with Albert [Wohlstetter], the problem of nuclear deterrence broke new ground and opened new alternatives for policymakers. I daresay that she has blankly enjoyed posing the same penetrating questions to her husband that she has to the intellectual and political leaders of the country. And that is certainly one explanation for the clarity and persuasiveness of his own voluminous words on strategy, politics, and world affairs.

Wohlstetter worked for the RAND Corporation, a nonprofit research organization based in Santa Monica, California, from 1948 to 1965, and continued to be a consultant through 2002.

Academic career
Wohlstetter taught at the University of Chicago, Barnard College, and Howard University.

Death
Wohlstetter died on January 6, 2007, at New York Hospital in New York City at age 94.

Publications
 Pearl Harbor: Warning and Decision. Stanford, Calif.: Stanford University Press (1962). . .
 Cuba and Pearl Harbor: Hindsight and Foresight. Santa Monica, Calif.: RAND Corporation (Apr. 1965).
 International Terrorism: Kidnapping to Win Friends and Influence People (1974).

Collected works
 Zarate, Robert, and Henry D. Sokolski, eds. (Jan. 26, 2009). Nuclear Heuristics: Selected Writings of Albert and Roberta Wohlstetter. Carlisle Barracks, Penn.: Strategic Studies Institute.
With commentary by Henry S. Rowen, Alain C. Enthoven, Richard Perle, Stephen J. Lukasik and Andrew W. Marshall.

References

Further reading

External links
Albert Wohlstetter official website
Roberta Wohlstetter at SourceWatch

20th-century American historians
American women political scientists
American political scientists
Vassar College alumni
Radcliffe College alumni
Columbia University alumni
University of Chicago faculty
Barnard College faculty
Howard University faculty
1912 births
2007 deaths
American women historians
20th-century American women writers
Presidential Medal of Freedom recipients
Bancroft Prize winners
21st-century American women
20th-century political scientists